Antonio Richieri (born 1600) was an Italian painter of the Baroque period.

Born in Ferrara, he trained under Giovanni Lanfranco, and followed his master to Naples and Rome. He painted some frescoes at the Theatini from the designs of Lanfranco.

References

1600 births
Year of death missing
17th-century Italian painters
Italian male painters
Painters from Ferrara
Painters from Bologna
Italian Baroque painters
Fresco painters